Ernest A. Hubka (August 13, 1897 – April 26, 1982) was an American football player and coach and also a member of the Nebraska Legislature. 

Hubka played college football at the University of Nebraska–Lincoln from 1917 to 1920. He served as the head football coach at the University of Omaha—now known as the University of Nebraska–Omaha—in 1928, compiling a record of 4–3–1.

Before serving as the head football coach at the University of Omaha, Hubka was a high school teacher in Yuma, Colorado, and York, Nebraska, from 1922 to 1926. After serving as a head football coach, Hubka began practicing law in Beatrice, Nebraska. From 1930 to 1938, he served as the county attorney of Gage County, Nebraska, and from 1946 to 1952 he served on the Beatrice Board of Education. In 1952, Hubka was elected to the Nebraska Legislature to represent District 30. He served two terms in the Nebraska Legislature from 1953 to 1957.

Head coaching record

References

External links
 

1897 births
1982 deaths
American football fullbacks
Nebraska Cornhuskers football players
Nebraska–Omaha Mavericks football coaches
People from Gage County, Nebraska
Players of American football from Nebraska
Nebraska state senators
20th-century American politicians